The play-offs games of the 2018 Fed Cup Asia/Oceania Zone Group I were the final stages of the Group I Zonal Competition, which involved teams from Asia and Oceania. Using the positions determined in their pools, the eight teams faced off to determine their placing in the 2018 Fed Cup Asia/Oceania Zone Group I. The winner of the promotional play-off advanced to the World Group II Play-offs, while the losers of the relegation play-offs were relegated to the Asia/Oceania Zone Group II in 2019.

Pool results

Promotion play-off 
The first placing teams of the two pools were drawn in head-to-head rounds. The winner advanced to the World Group II Play-offs.

Kazakhstan vs. Japan

3rd place play-off
The second placed teams of the two pools were drawn in head-to-head rounds to find the third placed team.

China vs. South Korea

Relegation play-off 
The third and fourth placed teams of the two pools were drawn in head-to-head rounds. The losers were relegated to Asia/Oceania Zone Group II in 2019.

India vs. Chinese Taipei

Thailand vs. Hong Kong

Final placements 

  was promoted to the 2018 Fed Cup World Group II Play-offs.

See also 
 Fed Cup structure

References

External links 
 Fed Cup website

2018 Fed Cup Asia/Oceania Zone